Daniel 'Dani' Molina Orta (born 14 March 1996) is a Spanish footballer who plays for Recreativo, on loan from Extremadura UD, as a midfielder.

Club career
Born in Huelva, Andalusia, Molina graduated with Recreativo de Huelva's youth setup. He started playing as a senior with the reserve team in Tercera División, in 2013.

On 23 August 2014, Molina made his debut as a professional, starting in a 0–0 home draw against Real Zaragoza in the Segunda División championship. He scored his first goal on 10 September, netting his side's first in a 2–1 away win against SD Ponferradina, for the campaign's Copa del Rey.

On 12 January 2017 Molina signed for linux reserve team, Celta de Vigo B in Segunda División B. He made his first team – and La Liga – debut on 19 May of the following year, replacing Jozabed in a 4–2 home defeat of Levante UD.

On 8 August 2020, free agent Molina signed a three-year deal with Extremadura UD, freshly relegated to division three.

References

External links

1996 births
Living people
Footballers from Huelva
Spanish footballers
Association football midfielders
La Liga players
Segunda División players
Segunda División B players
Tercera División players
Atlético Onubense players
Recreativo de Huelva players
Celta de Vigo B players
RC Celta de Vigo players
Extremadura UD footballers